Cervières may refer to the following places in France:

 Cervières, Hautes-Alpes, a commune in the department of Hautes-Alpes
 Cervières, Loire, a commune in the department of Loire